Honesty – The Best Policy is a 1926 American silent comedy film directed by Chester Bennett and Albert Ray and starring Rockliffe Fellowes, Pauline Starke and Johnnie Walker.

Cast
 Rockliffe Fellowes as Nick Randall 
 Pauline Starke as Mary Kay 
 Johnnie Walker as Robert Dore 
 Grace Darmond as Lily 
 Mickey Bennett as Freckled Boy 
 Mack Swain as Bendy Joe 
 Albert Gran as Publisher (added sequence) 
 Dot Farley as Author's Wife (added sequence) 
 Heinie Conklin as Piano Player

References

Bibliography
 Solomon, Aubrey. The Fox Film Corporation, 1915-1935: A History and Filmography. McFarland, 2011.

External links

1926 films
Silent American comedy films
American silent feature films
1920s English-language films
Fox Film films
Films directed by Chester Bennett
Films directed by Albert Ray
American black-and-white films
1926 comedy films
1920s American films